Frederick "Cy" Williams (December 21, 1887 – April 23, 1974) was an American professional baseball player. He played in Major League Baseball as an outfielder for the Chicago Cubs (1912–17) and Philadelphia Phillies (1918–30). As Major League Baseball emerged from the dead-ball era, Williams became one of the most prominent home run hitters in the National League.

Baseball career
Born in Wadena, Indiana, Williams attended Notre Dame where he studied architecture and played football with Knute Rockne. His hitting prowess caught the attention of the Chicago Cubs, who purchased his contract after he graduated from college. Williams made his major league debut with the Cubs on July 18, 1912 at the age of 24. From 1915 to 1927 he was a consistent power hitting center fielder, leading the National League in home runs four times during his career.

Williams was the first National League player to hit 200 career home runs, and is one of three players born before 1900 to hit 200 homers in his career (Babe Ruth and Rogers Hornsby are the others). He was the National League's career home run leader until his record of 251 was surpassed by Hornsby in 1929.

In a 19-year major league career, Williams played in 2,002 games, accumulating 1,981 hits in 6,780 at bats for a .292 career batting average along with 251 home runs, 1,005 runs batted in and an on-base percentage of .365. He hit over .300 six times in his career. An excellent defensive player, Williams had a .973 career fielding percentage, which was nine points higher than the league average during his playing career.

The Williams Shift, in which defensive players moved to the right side of the playing field, is often associated with Ted Williams, but it was actually first employed against Cy Williams during the 1920s. He played in his final major league game on September 22, 1930 at the age of 42. In 1931, Williams served as a player-manager in the minor leagues for the Richmond Byrds of the Eastern League.

Later life
After retirement, Williams worked as an architect at the 3 Lakes Theatre in Three Lakes, Wisconsin since 1949. Before that, he designed the 3 Lakes Theatre's exterior and interior and later opened that June of the same year.

See also

 List of Major League Baseball career home run leaders
 List of Major League Baseball career runs scored leaders
 List of Major League Baseball career runs batted in leaders
 List of Major League Baseball annual home run leaders
 List of Major League Baseball players to hit for the cycle
 Major League Baseball titles leaders

References

External links
, or Retrosheet
 
 

1887 births
1974 deaths
Major League Baseball center fielders
National League home run champions
Chicago Cubs players
Philadelphia Phillies players
Minor league baseball managers
Richmond Byrds players
Notre Dame Fighting Irish baseball players
Notre Dame Fighting Irish football players
Notre Dame Fighting Irish men's track and field athletes
Baseball players from Indiana
People from Benton County, Indiana
People from Three Lakes, Wisconsin
University of Notre Dame alumni
20th-century American architects